Randy Myers (born 1962) is an American baseball player.

Randy Myers may also refer to:

Randy Myers (animator) (born 1967), American animator
Randy Myers (golf trainer), American golf instructor